Victor Arden was the stage name for an American pianist named Lewis John Fuiks (8 March 1893 — 31 July 1962) who was best known as the piano duo partner of and co-orchestra leader with Phil Ohman from 1922 to 1932.  He was the pianist in the All-Star Trio, who made several hits for Victor Records between 1919 and 1921.

Early years
Arden was born March 8, 1893, in Wenona, Illinois.

Radio
In 1935, Arden was described in a newspaper article as "well-known to music lovers and radio listeners." At the time, Arden's orchestra was featured on Musical Moments, which was carried on over 300 stations weekly.

Recording
Before 1920, Arden was making piano rolls to be reproduced on player pianos manufactured by the American Piano Company.

Death
Arden died July 31, 1962, in New York City.

Selected compositions 
1909
 Safety Pin Catch
1918
 Just Blue, also by Frank Wheeler Wadsworth (1889–1929)
1919
 In My Dreams
 Lucille, also by Frank Wheeler Wadsworth (1889–1929)
 Marilynn, also by Frank Wheeler Wadsworth (1889–1929)
 Honeymoon Waltz, words by Ray Sherwood (born 1895), music by Victor Arden
1920
 Hy n' Dry
 Rose of the Orient, also by Frank Wheeler Wadsworth (1889–1929) & George Hamilton Green 
 Dolly, I Love You, also by Frank Wheeler Wadsworth (1889–1929) & Dick Long
 Molly, also by Frank Wheeler Wadsworth (1889–1929) & Dick Long
 Who Wants a Baby?, also by George Hamilton Green
 Dottie Dimples, also by George Hamilton Green
 In Blossom Time, also by Louis Weslyn (pseudonym for Weslyn Jones) (1884–1937)
1921
 'Round the Town
 Hand Painted Doll, also by George Hamilton Green
 Lonesome Land, also by George Hamilton Green
1922
 After A While (You're Goin' to Feel Blue), also by George Hamilton Green & Walter Hirsch (1891–1967)
 My Sweet Gal, also by George Hamilton Green
 I'm Happy: Fox Trot, also by George Hamilton Green
1930
 Dancing the Devil Away
1941
 Hearts in Harmony
 We'd Rather Die Upon Our Feet Than Live Upon Our Knees, words by Henry A. Murphy, melody by Joseph Russel Robinson (1892–1963) & Victor Arden 
 Unity, words by Henry A. Murphy, melody by Joseph Russel Robinson (1892–1963) & Victor Arden
 Let's Incorporate, also by Lawrence M. Klee (died 1957)

Education 
Arden was a graduate of the University of Chicago and studied at the American Conservatory of Music in Chicago.

Family 
Arden was married twice.  He first married Ilse Alma Spindler (born April 1894) – a 1916 graduate of the University of Chicago – in Chicago, on May 2, 1917.  Lewis and Alma had two sons: Robert Spindler Fuiks (1921–2009) and Lewis John Fuiks Jr. (1919–2004).  Victor remarried in the 1950s to Frances Newsom, a classical soprano.

References

External links 
 William Edwards biography database, Ashburn, Virginia
 Robert Perry, piano roll historian, Auckland, New Zealand
 Victor Arden recordings at the Discography of American Historical Recordings.

1893 births
1962 deaths
20th-century American composers
20th-century American pianists
American Conservatory of Music alumni
American male composers
American pop pianists
American male pianists
20th-century American male musicians